The 2000 Rice Owls football team represented Rice University in the 2000 NCAA Division I-A college football season. The Owls, led by head coach Ken Hatfield, played their home games at Rice Stadium in Houston.

Schedule

References

Rice
Rice Owls football seasons
Rice Owls football